The men's triple jump event was part of the track and field athletics programme at the 1924 Summer Olympics. The competition was held on Saturday, July 12, 1924. Twenty triple jumpers from twelve nations competed. The maximum number of athletes per nation was 4. The event was won by Nick Winter of Australia, the nation winning gold in its debut in the event. Argentina also medaled in its first triple jump appearance, with Luis Brunetto taking silver. Defending champion Vilho Tuulos of Finland took bronze, the fourth man to win a second medal in the event.

Background

This was the seventh appearance of the event, which is one of 12 athletics events to have been held at every Summer Olympics. Returning finalists from the 1920 Games were gold medalist Vilho Tuulos of Finland and silver medalist Folke Jansson and fourth-place finisher Ivar Sahlin of Sweden. Tuulos was favored to repeat, having recently jumped just short of the world record (15.48 metres, the second-best ever after the world record of 15.52).

Argentina, Australia, Bulgaria, Ireland, Japan, and the Netherlands each made their first appearance in the event. The United States competed for the seventh time, having competed at each of the Games so far.

Competition format

The competition was described as two rounds at the time, but was more similar to the modern divided final. All athletes received three jumps initially. The top six after that received an additional three jumps to improve their distance, but the initial jumps would still count if no improvement was made.

Records

These were the standing world and Olympic records (in metres) prior to the 1924 Summer Olympics.

In the qualification Luis Brunetto set a new Olympic record with 15.425 metres. In the final Nick Winter set a new world record with 15.525 metres.

Schedule

Results

The best six triple jumpers, both groups counted together, qualified for the final. The jumping order and the jumping series are not available.

There were 17 nonstarters.

References

External links
 Official Report
 

Men's triple jump
Triple jump at the Olympics